Last Man Standing is an Australian television series which aired in Australia from June 2005 to October 2005 on Seven Network; and in New Zealand from April to September 2005. It was aired also in Finland (Viimeiseen mieheen) in 2007. The series did not return for a second season.

Overview

The main characters are three best friends — Adam, Bruno and Cameron — who live and work in Melbourne. Adam is newly single, having come out of a long-term relationship, and is dealing with the dating world for the first time in a long time. Cameron is the sexual predator of the group, although this role has been somewhat lessened by the fact that his ex-wife Zoe — who left when he had an affair — is now part of the group, and is becoming friends with the women he dates. Bruno is a nurse who has a habit of falling for women who don't care for him, while ignoring the many women who do. All three are discovering that, in their late twenties, they are still single and really have no idea about women whatsoever.

In keeping with the show's distinctly Melbourne feel, iconic Melbourne rock band Dallas Crane recorded a cover of Come See Me, originally by The Pretty Things, for the show's theme tune.  The cover can be found as a B-side to the band's Curiosity single

Cast

Main
 Rodger Corser as Adam Logan
 Travis McMahon as Bruno Palmer
 Matt Passmore as Cameron Kennedy
 Miriama Smith as Zoe Hesketh

Recurring
 Fletcher Humphrys as Anto
 Anita Hegh as Marly
 Jesse Griffin as Chich
 Nikola Dubois as Taia
 Jacinta Stapleton as Syl
 Stephen Phillips as Mark
 Gillian Hardy as Anne
 Terry Kenwrick as Gavin
 Kat Stewart as Claire
 Cal Wilson as Nurse Jude Vanderwert
 Susan Godfrey as Nurse Rachel Barton

Broadcast history
The series premiered in Australia on 6 June 2005 - although it premiered in New Zealand some two months earlier. It struggled to find an audience from the beginning, with an average Australian viewership of 750,000 weekly viewers. These low ratings occurred despite the show having Desperate Housewives as a lead in, which at the time was attracting over 2 million viewers a week.

It was thought by critics that Last Man Standing appealed only to "inner city lefties", unlike past successful Australian dramas such as Blue Heelers and All Saints which have more widespread demographic appeal.

Given that a full 22 episodes had been filmed before the series began airing, the Seven Network aired consistent repeats to allow the show to find an audience. Ratings didn't climb, however, and in early September, the network announced the show's cancellation. The series finale aired on 25 October. This episode ended in a cliffhanger, which - due to the show's cancellation - will remain unresolved.

The series began its airing in the UK on the FX channel in early 2006.

The series began its airing in Finland on the Sub (formerly known as Subtv) channel in June 2007.

See also
List of Australian television series

References

External links

Last Man Standing at the National Film and Sound Archive
 Last Man Standing on 7plus

Australian drama television series
Seven Network original programming
2005 Australian television series debuts
2005 Australian television series endings